Alfred C. "Allie" McGuire (born July 10, 1951) is an American former basketball player in the National Basketball Association (NBA). He was drafted in the third round of the 1973 NBA draft by the New York Knicks and played with the team that year.

McGuire is the son of Al McGuire and nephew of Dick McGuire. He appeared on the cover of Sports Illustrated in February 1972. McGuire played at the collegiate level with the then-Marquette Warriors.

References

1951 births
Living people
American men's basketball players
Basketball players from New York City
Marquette Golden Eagles men's basketball players
New York Knicks players
New York Knicks draft picks
Shooting guards
Marquette University High School alumni